WKFT (101.3 MHz, "Bigfoot Country 102.1 & 101.3") is an FM radio station licensed to Strattanville, Pennsylvania. The station broadcasts a country music format with sister station WIFT and is owned by Kristin Cantrell, through licensee Southern Belle, LLC.

History
On May 30, 2017, WZDD changed their format from mainstream rock (simulcasting WZDB 95.9 Sykesville) to country, branded as "Bigfoot Country 102.1 & 101.3" (simulcasting WIFT 102.1 FM Du Bois).

References

External links
WKFT's official website

KFT (FM)
Country radio stations in the United States
Radio stations established in 2013
2013 establishments in Pennsylvania